Jacques Albert Davy (30 November 1882 – 12 October 1944) was a French footballer who played as a midfielder and defender. He played in the first match of the history of the France national team, a 3–3 draw against Belgium on 1 May 1904. At club level, he played for US Parisienne.

References 

1882 births
1944 deaths
Footballers from Paris
French footballers
US Parisienne players
Association football midfielders
Association football defenders
France international footballers